The Conquest of California, also known as the Conquest of Alta California or the California Campaign, was an important military campaign of the Mexican–American War carried out by the United States in Alta California (modern-day California), then a part of Mexico. The conquest lasted from 1846 into 1847, until military leaders from both the Californios and Americans signed the Treaty of Cahuenga, which ended the conflict in California.

Background 

When war was declared on May 13, 1846 between the United States and Mexico, it took almost three months for definitive word of Congress' declaration of war to reach the Pacific coast. U.S. consul Thomas O. Larkin, stationed in the pueblo of Monterey, was concerned about the increasing possibility of war and worked to prevent bloodshed between the Americans and the small Mexican military garrison at the Presidio of Monterey, commanded by José Castro.

United States Army Captain John C. Frémont, on a survey expedition of the U.S. Army Corps of Topographical Engineers with about 60 well-armed men, crossed the Sierra Nevada range in December 1845. They had reached the Oregon Territory by May 1846, when Frémont received word that war between Mexico and the U.S. was imminent.

Bear Flag Revolt 

On June 14, 1846, the Bear Flag Revolt occurred when some 30 rebels, mostly American pioneers, staged a revolt in response to government threats of expulsion and seized the small Mexican Sonoma Barracks garrison, in the pueblo of Sonoma north of San Francisco Bay. There they formed the California Republic, created the "Bear Flag", and raised it over Sonoma. Eleven days later, troops led by Frémont, who had acted on his own authority, arrived from Sutter's Fort to support the rebels. No government was ever organized, but the Bear Flag Revolt has become part of the state's folklore. The present-day California state flag is based on this original Bear Flag, and continues to display the words "California Republic."

Northern California 

Prior to the Mexican–American War, preparations for a possible conflict led to the U.S. Pacific Squadron being extensively reinforced until it had roughly half of the ships in the United States Navy. Since it took 120 to over 200 days to sail from Atlantic ports on the east coast, around Cape Horn, to the Pacific ports in the Sandwich Islands and then the mainland west coast, these movements had to be made well in advance of any possible conflict to be effective. Initially, with no United States ports in the Pacific, the squadron's ships operated out of storeships that provided naval supplies, purchased food and obtained water from local ports of call in the Sandwich Islands and on the Pacific coast. Their orders were, upon determining "beyond a doubt" that war had been declared, to capture the ports and cities of Alta California.

Commodore John Drake Sloat, commander of the Pacific Squadron, on being informed of an outbreak of hostilities between Mexico and the United States, as well as the Bear Flag Revolt in Sonoma, ordered his naval forces to occupy ports in northern Alta California. Two days later on July 9, which had been berthed at Sausalito, captured Yerba Buena (present-day San Francisco) in the "Battle of Yerba Buena", again without firing a shot. On July 15, Sloat transferred his command to Commodore Robert F. Stockton, a much more aggressive leader. Convincing news of a state of war between the U.S. and Mexico had previously reached Stockton. The 400 to 650 marines and bluejackets (sailors) of Stockton's Pacific Squadron were the largest U.S. ground force in California. The rest of Stockton's men were needed to man his vessels.

To supplement this remaining force, Commodore Stockton ordered Captain John C. Frémont, on the U.S. Army Corps of Topographical Engineers survey, to secure 100 volunteers (he received 160) in addition to the California Battalion he had earlier organized. They were to act primarily as occupation forces to free up Stockton's marines and sailors. The core of the California Battalion was the approximately 30 army personnel and 30 scouts, guards, ex-fur trappers, Indians, geographers, topographers and cartographers in Frémont's exploration force, which was joined by about 150 Bear Flaggers.  The American marines, sailors, and militia easily took over the cities and ports of northern California; within days they controlled Monterey, San Francisco, Sonoma, Sutter's Fort, New Helvetia, and other small pueblos in northern Alta California. Nearly all were occupied without a shot being fired. Some of the southern pueblos and ports were also rapidly occupied, with almost no bloodshed.

Southern California

Californios and the war 
Prior to the U.S. occupation, the population of Spanish and Mexican people in Alta California was approximately 1500 men and 6500 women and children, who were known as Californios. Many lived in or near the small Pueblo of Los Angeles (present-day Los Angeles).

Most of the approximately 800 American and other immigrants (primarily adult males) lived in the northern half of California, approved of breaking from the Mexican government, and gave only token to no resistance to the forces of Stockton and Frémont.

Siege of Los Angeles 

In Southern California, Mexican General José Castro and Alta California Governor Pío Pico fled the Pueblo of Los Angeles before the arrival of American forces. On August 13, 1846, when Stockton's forces entered Los Angeles with no resistance, the nearly bloodless conquest of California seemed complete. The force of 36 that Stockton left in Los Angeles, however, was too small and, in addition, enforced a tyrannical control of the citizenry. On September 29, in the Siege of Los Angeles, the independent Californios, under the leadership of José María Flores, forced the small American garrison to retire to the harbor.

Soon afterward, 200 reinforcements sent by Stockton and led by U.S. Navy Captain William Mervine were repulsed on October 8 in the one-hour Battle of Dominguez Rancho on Rancho San Pedro, with four Americans killed. In late November, General Stephen W. Kearny, with a squadron of 100 dragoons, finally reached the Colorado River at the present-day California border after a grueling march across the province of Santa Fe de Nuevo México and the Sonoran Desert. Then, on December 6, they fought the botched half-hour Battle of San Pasqual east of San Diego pueblo, where 21 of Kearny's troops were killed, the largest number of American casualties in the battles of the California Campaign.

Final conquest 
Stockton rescued Kearny's surrounded forces and, with their combined force totaling 660 troops, they moved northward from San Diego, entering the Los Angeles Basin on January 8, 1847. On that day they fought the Californios in the Battle of Rio San Gabriel and the next day in the Battle of La Mesa. The last significant body of Californios surrendered to American forces on January 12, marking the end of the war in Alta California.

Aftermath

Treaty of Cahuenga 

The Treaty of Cahuenga was signed on January 13, 1847, and essentially terminated hostilities in Alta California. The treaty was drafted in English and Spanish by José Antonio Carrillo and approved by American Brigadier General John C. Frémont and Californio General Andrés Pico at Campo de Cahuenga in the Cahuenga Pass of Los Angeles. It was later ratified by Frémont's superiors, Commodore Robert F. Stockton and General Stephen Kearny (brevet rank).

Pacific Coast Campaign 

In July 1846, Colonel Jonathan D. Stevenson of New York was asked to raise a volunteer regiment of ten companies of 77 men each to go to California with the understanding that they would muster out and stay in California. They were designated the 1st Regiment of New York Volunteers and took part in the Pacific Coast Campaign. In August and September 1846 the regiment trained and prepared for the trip to California.

Three private merchant ships, Thomas H Perkins, Loo Choo, and Susan Drew, were chartered, and the sloop  was assigned convoy detail. On September 26 the four ships sailed for California. Fifty men who had been left behind for various reasons sailed on November 13, 1846 on the small storeship USS Brutus. The Susan Drew and Loo Choo reached Valparaíso, Chile by January 20, 1847 and they were on their way again by January 23. The Perkins did not stop until San Francisco, reaching port on March 6, 1847. The Susan Drew arrived on March 20 and the Loo Choo arrived on March 26, 1847, 183 days after leaving New York. The Brutus finally arrived on April 17.

After desertions and deaths in transit the four ships brought 648 men to California. The companies were then deployed throughout Upper Alta California and Lower Baja California on the Baja California Peninsula (captured by the Navy and later returned to Mexico), from San Francisco to La Paz. The ship Isabella  sailed from Philadelphia on August 16, 1846, with a detachment of one hundred soldiers, and arrived in California on February 18, 1847 at about the same time that the ship Sweden arrived with another detachment of soldiers. These soldiers were added to the existing companies of Stevenson's 1st New York Volunteer Regiment. These troops essentially took over nearly all of the Pacific Squadron's onshore military and garrison duties and the California Battalion's garrison duties.

In January 1847, Lieutenant William Tecumseh Sherman and about 100 regular U.S. Army soldiers arrived in Monterey. American forces in the pipeline continued to dribble into California.

Mormon Battalion

The Mormon Battalion served from July 1846 to July 1847 during the Mexican–American War. The battalion was a volunteer unit of between 534 and 559 Latter-day Saints men, who were led by Mormon company officers and commanded by regular United States Army senior officers. During its service, the battalion made a grueling march of some 1,900 miles from Council Bluffs, Iowa to San Diego. This remains one of the longest single military marches in U.S. history.

The Mormon Battalion arrived in San Diego on January 29, 1847. For the next five months until their discharge on July 16, 1847 in Los Angeles, the battalion trained and did garrison duties in several locations in southern California. Discharged members of the Mormon Battalion were helping to build a sawmill for John Sutter when gold was discovered there in January 1848, starting the California Gold Rush.

Treaty of Guadalupe Hidalgo 
The Treaty of Guadalupe Hidalgo, signed in February 1848, marked the end of the Mexican–American War. By the terms of the treaty, Mexico formally ceded Alta California along with its other northern territories east through Texas, receiving $15,000,000 in exchange. This largely unsettled territory constituted nearly half of its claimed territory with about 1% of its then population of about 4,500,000.

California Genocide 

The conquest and California officially becoming part of the United States set off a genocide against the indigenous peoples of California. The United States federal government and the newly created state government of California incited, aided, and financed the violence against the Native Americans, including massacres, cultural genocide, and forced enslavement. On January 6, 1851, at his State of the State address to the California Senate, the first Governor Peter Burnett said: "That a war of extermination will continue to be waged between the races until the Indian race becomes extinct must be expected. While we cannot anticipate this result but with painful regret, the inevitable destiny of the race is beyond the power or wisdom of man to avert." Between 1846 and 1873, it is estimated that non-Natives killed between 9,492 and 16,094 California Natives. Hundreds to thousands were additionally starved or worked to death. Acts of enslavement, kidnapping, rape, child separation and displacement were widespread. These acts were encouraged, tolerated, and carried out by state authorities and militias.

Timeline of events

See also 
 Conquest of California topics
 Mexican California topics
 Mexican–American War
 Pacific Coast Campaign
 History of California through 1899
 Indigenous peoples of California

Notes

Further reading 
Downey, Joseph, T., Ordinary Seaman, USN; Edited by Lamar, Howard. (1963-Reissued). The Cruise of the Portsmouth, 1845–1847, A Sailor's View of the Naval Conquest of California.  Yale University Press.
 Hubert Howe Bancroft. The Works of Hubert Howe Bancroft, vol 22 (1886), History of California 1846–48; complete text online; famous, highly detailed narrative written in the 1880s.  Also at History of California, VOL. V., 1846–1848
 
 Harlow, Neal California Conquered: The Annexation of a Mexican Province 1846–1850, (1982)
 Hittell, Theodore Henry. History of California vol 2 (1885) online
 Nevins, Allan. Fremont: Pathmarker of the West, Volume 1: Fremont the Explorer (1939, rev ed. 1955)
 Rawls, James and Walton Bean. California:  An Interpretive History (8th ed 2003), college textbook; the latest version of Bean's solid 1968 text

External links 

A Continent Divided: The U.S. – Mexico War – from the Center for Greater Southwestern Studies, the University of Texas at Arlington.
Map of Mexico and the United States during the California Campaign at omniatlas.com

 
Mexican California
California
1846 in the Mexican-American War
1847 in the Mexican-American War
Military history of California
Pre-statehood history of California
California
1846 in Alta California
1847 in Alta California
California